The Oklahoman is a 1957 American CinemaScope Western film starring Joel McCrea, Barbara Hale, and Brad Dexter. It was also the last film of actress Esther Dale.

Plot
On his way to California, a doctor, John Brighton, decides to stay in Oklahoma Territory after his wife dies in childbirth. He takes a room at the home of elderly Mrs. Fitzgerald, who helps raise his new daughter Louise.

Five years later, as he becomes acquainted with attractive widow Anne Barnes and her mother, Mrs. Waynebrook, the doctor treats the ill child of an Indian named Charlie. He also meets Charlie's teen daughter, Maria, who is so good with children that he puts Louise in her care after Mrs. Fitzgerald's death.

Wealthy rancher Cass Dobie and brother Mel are gobbling up land in the territory. When they determine that oil is on Charlie's property, they scheme to get it. Mel even tries to shoot Charlie, but is killed in self-defense. John testifies on Charlie's behalf.

While awaiting a legal decision on the shooting, Maria professes her love for John. The angry Cass has a confrontation with John, who prevails, after which Maria realizes that John is actually in love with Anne.

Cast
 Joel McCrea as John Brighton
 Barbara Hale as Anne Barnes
 Brad Dexter as Cass Dobie
 Verna Felton as Mrs. Waynebrook
 Douglas Dick as Mel Dobie
 Michael Pate as Charlie
 Gloria Talbott as Maria
 Esther Dale as Mrs. Fitzgerald
 Ray Teal as Jason
 Scotty Beckett as Messenger at Ranch (uncredited)
 Mimi Gibson as Louise Brighton

Comic book adaptation
 Dell Four Color #820 (June 1957)

References

External links
 
 
 
 

1957 Western (genre) films
1957 films
Allied Artists films
CinemaScope films
American Western (genre) films
Films directed by Francis D. Lyon
Films produced by Walter Mirisch
Films adapted into comics
Films scored by Hans J. Salter
Films set in Oklahoma
1950s English-language films
1950s American films